Graeme Taggart (born 16 February 1941) is a former  Australian rules footballer who played with North Melbourne in the Victorian Football League (VFL).

Notes

External links 

Living people
1941 births
Australian rules footballers from Victoria (Australia)
North Melbourne Football Club players
Port Melbourne Football Club players